Brunswick Hospital Center or Brunswick Hall Psychiatric Hospital was a psychiatric hospital in Amityville, New York.  The American Hospital Directory reported that there were 146 staffed beds in the hospital in 2021.

History

Portions of the hospital opened in the early 1900s. "The 477-bed Brunswick Hospital once employed about 1,400 people. It was privately owned by the family of Benjamin Stein, a radiologist who took it over in the early 1950s. Stein's real estate holdings surrounding the hospital were once valued at more than $40 million, court records show." Many buildings were demolished in 2012, and village officials are considering plans for the property's future.

The Brunswick Medical Center opened in 1978 and after a string of financial troubles, was turned over to Suffolk County, NY. The buildings ongoing expenses totaled over US$20,000/mo and the property sat vacant from 2011 to 2013.

Only the psychiatric division, Brunswick Hall Psychiatric Hospital, remains in operation today.

Brunswick Hall functions with multiple units for each type of patient. The units (not all units names are known) are ADE (for adolescent males), ADW (for mixed adults), Legacy (for criminal disorders) and Horizon (geriatrics).

The nearby South Oaks Hospital specializes in psychiatric treatment for people of varying acuities.

References

Psychiatric hospitals in New York (state)
Unused buildings in New York (state)